WLEM (1250 AM) is a commercial AM radio station licensed to serve Emporium, Pennsylvania. The station is owned by Salter Communications, Inc. and broadcasts a classic hits format.

History
The station's first license was granted on April 15, 1958.

References

External links

LEM
Radio stations established in 1958
1958 establishments in Pennsylvania